Elisa Calsi (born 6 March 1937) is an Italian former gymnast. She competed in seven events at the 1956 Summer Olympics.

References

External links
 

1937 births
Living people
Italian female artistic gymnasts
Olympic gymnasts of Italy
Gymnasts at the 1956 Summer Olympics
People from Lodi, Lombardy
Sportspeople from the Province of Lodi